Agnes Geijer (26 October 1898 – 17 July 1989) was a Swedish textile historian and archaeologist.

Life
Geijer became the head of the textile conservation atelier Pietas in 1930. She received a doctoral degree from Uppsala University in 1938, and became employed at the Swedish History Museum in 1941. She was active there from 1947 as a textile conservator.

Geijer died in 1989. A foundation in her name awards grants and scholarships to students of the history of textiles from eight Nordic countries.

Works translated into English
The Conservation of Flags in Sweden, 1957
A History of Textile Art (revised translated by Roger Tanner), 1979 
Oriental Textiles in Sweden, 1951
Textile Treasures of Uppsala Cathedral: From Eight Centuries, 1964
The Viminacium Gold Tapestry: A Unique Textile Fragment from Hungary (edited by B. Thomas), 1964
Studies in Textile History: In Memory of Harold B. Burnham (edited by Veronika Gervers), 1977

References

Further reading 

 

Swedish art historians
Swedish archaeologists
Swedish women archaeologists
20th-century Swedish historians
20th-century archaeologists
Uppsala University alumni
Women art historians
1898 births
1989 deaths
Burials at Uppsala old cemetery
20th-century Swedish women writers
Textile historians

Agnes